Santiago Arrieta (1897, Uruguay – 1975, Buenos Aires, Argentina) was a Uruguayan film actor, also known as Santiago Donadío. After emigrating to Argentina, Arrieta appeared in 26 films between 1935 and 1962.

Selected filmography
 La fuga (1937)
 Only the Valiant (1940)
 The Soul of the Accordion (1935)
 The Boys Didn't Wear Hair Gel Before (1937)
 A Story of the Nineties (1949)
 I Was Born in Buenos Aires (1959)
 The Last Floor (1962)

References

Bibliography
 Finkielman, Jorge. The Film Industry in Argentina: An Illustrated Cultural History. McFarland, 24 December 2003.

External links 
 

1897 births
1975 deaths
Uruguayan male film actors
Argentine male film actors